"Owner of a Lonely Heart" is a song by British progressive rock band Yes. It is the first track and single from their eleventh studio album, 90125 (1983), and was released in October 1983. Written primarily by guitarist and singer Trevor Rabin, contributions were made to the final version by singer Jon Anderson, bassist Chris Squire, and producer Trevor Horn.

"Owner of a Lonely Heart" was released in October 1983, as the album's first single. It was a commercial success in the United States, becoming the band's first and only single to reach No. 1 on the Billboard Hot 100 chart and its Hot Mainstream Rock Tracks chart. In 1984, the song reached No. 8 in the year-end charts in the US. The single was reissued various times throughout the 1980s and 1990s with different remix versions and B-sides.

Development

Origins and demo version

The song originated in 1979 from South African musician, singer-songwriter, and producer Trevor Rabin; while going to the toilet, he wrote "the whole thing, from beginning to end". Rabin then put down his ideas onto tape using his home equipment which included a 4-track tape machine. One of the recordings consisted of the main verse and chorus riff played on an acoustic guitar with some vocals. A developed version with drums, keyboards, and a complete set of lyrics was completed in 1980. Both recordings were released on Rabin's demo compilation album 90124, in 2003. For the full version, Rabin used the first and second tracks to record the instruments and vocals before mixing the song onto the third. He added: "You would be making decisions based on what was coming, and sometimes those decisions would be wrong – but you couldn't undo them. One of the things, a happy accident, was that all of the brass stabs and those weird things that happen on the record – they were just a product of what happened with the demo".

After relocating to Los Angeles in 1981, Rabin added the song to his collection of demos that he wished to develop for a fourth solo album. Among the record labels that Rabin pitched his work to was Arista Records, but he recalled owner Clive Davis rejecting them on the basis of the songs sounding "too strange, and would not be a hit", and suggesting that Rabin "write stuff more like Foreigner and then come back. I never did". Rabin then landed a development deal with Geffen Records who introduced Rabin to musicians with the intention of forming Asia, but Rabin declined due to the lack of chemistry and his preference for making a solo album.

Rabin's deal with Geffen ended in 1982, but an offer from A&R man Ron Fair of RCA Records was the first time Rabin's songs were recognised as potential hits. Rabin said Fair called "Owner of a Lonely Heart" "a game changer" and offered him an album deal on the strength of it. However, Rabin turned it down when he agreed to form a new band with bassist Chris Squire and drummer Alan White of the progressive rock band Yes and make an album, initially under the name Cinema, for Atco Records. Much of the new material derived from Rabin's demos, including "Hold On" and "Changes", and displayed a more pop-oriented approach than what Yes had been known for. The group worked with former Yes singer Trevor Horn as their producer.

Development and production
By January 1983, most of the backing tracks and vocals for the Cinema album had been recorded, but an additional song was needed. While Rabin was on a toilet break, Horn left his demo tape running and heard his version of "Owner of a Lonely Heart". He disliked Rabin's inclinations toward "American rock" in his songs and its verse lyrics, which he remembered as: "You don't wanna go dancing, you won't even answer the phone. You so scared of romancing, everything you do is alone". However, he recognised the "powerful" introduction with its "snap jump cut" into the main riff, plus its strong chorus hook, as a hit single. "The verses of it were so awful that I was convinced that if we didn't put loads of whizz, bangs and gags all over the verse that no one would ever listen to it".

Horn recalled pleading with the band to record it on the grounds that they needed a hit single, despite the group's reluctance. Subsequent musical and lyrical changes were then made by Horn and Squire, and for several days the group attempted to perform it. Horn was dissatisfied with the addition of various drum fills and superfluous sections, and suggested they record it "straight and simple" without changing the original riff. Rabin agreed to change his song this way, but wanted to keep the sound levels "very loud" which Horn "was totally into". It took Horn approximately seven months to convince Rabin to rewrite the lyrics. Once Rabin agreed, several versions were produced which included Horn's contribution of the verses including: "Move yourself, you always live your life...", which earned him 15% of the song credit.

For the song's opening, Rabin used the same guitar tone that he'd employed on a session he did for Manfred Mann's Earth Band, which involved panning two guitar tracks left and right and aiming for a sound "as heavy as possible". The arpeggiated guitar part on the verses, according to Horn, was played on a 12-string Rickenbacker, though has been disputed. Chris Squire's bass guitar parts were played on his custom-built Electra MPC Outlaw - making use of two of its plug-in features (the octave box and the phaser) - run through a 100-watt Marshall amplifier:

Squire also added a Motown-influenced bridge section to the song, following the second chorus.

After the band had produced a satisfactory arrangement, Horn wished to incorporate a drum programmer, which the band, particularly White, strongly objected to at first. Horn prevailed, resulting in Squire and himself programming a drum machine sequence for the song. Rabin tried numerous times to persuade Horn and engineer Gary Langan to retain the heavy drum sound that he had used on the song's demo, but they wanted it changed as it did not suit White's sound or drumming style. Horn wanted to use a drum sound similar to that of Stewart Copeland on Synchronicity (1983) by The Police, and tuned White's snare drum to the key of a high A. Atlantic president Ahmet Ertegun liked a mix that Horn had made, and decreed that Rabin's idea for a big drum sound would not be used. Horn also used a five-second sample of the drum breakdown in "Kool is Back" by jazz and soul group Funk, Inc. (itself a cover of "Kool's Back Again" by Kool & the Gang): Alan White incorporated this into the song's midsection drum break, which he played on Fairlight.

At Horn's suggestion, Rabin used the Synclavier synthesiser and sampler to replace his original keyboard parts. On the demo version, the breaks and flourishes had been played on a Minimoog synthesiser: Horn wished to keep them in the final song and had them rerecorded on his Fairlight CMI sampler, as well as reworking some of them using Synclavier and Fairlight patches and noises. For the "whizz, bangs and gags" sound effects, Horn used the Fairlight (programmed by J. J. Jeczalik). According to musician Questlove, "Owner of a Lonely Heart" contained the first use of a sample as a breakbeat, as opposed to a sound effect.

In April 1983, former Yes singer Jon Anderson joined the group (which resulted in Cinema changing their name to Yes). Anderson recorded his vocals to the songs while changing some of the musical and lyrical content. Horn remembered Anderson disliking the song's new lyrics and his comment: "Well, it's not like 'Send in the Clowns' anyway". Consequently, Anderson rewrote Horn's lyrics for the second verse, including the line "Watch it now, the eagle in the sky". As a cheeky riposte, Horn and Langan added a gunshot sound effect immediately following that verse, thereby "shooting down" the eagle.  Trevor Rabin has stated that Trevor Horn did not like some of Anderson's lyrics, and had Rabin redo the words sounding like Anderson; "If you go back and listen to it I'm sure you can find them."   

The final song was credited to Rabin, Anderson, Squire and Horn. Rabin recently clarified his view on the breakdown of credit and royalties: "Jon did add to my lyrics in the verses and deserved what he got, as did Chris. One can hear my development of the song on 90124; sound doesn't lie. Trevor Horn being allotted a percentage was a thank you for introducing me to the Synclavier, which is one of the keyboards I used on the song and I had not used before. Also, for the fun we had making it".

Horn has rated "Owner of a Lonely Heart" as one of the best tracks of his career.

Reception
Cash Box said that "Horn constructs an instrumental intro segment of discrete drumrolls, fuzz guitar phrases, and scratched-in brass and synth flourishes and then uses these and other elements to punctuate Jon Anderson’s fluid depiction of the title subject" and that the song "is built upon a steady dance beat, which brings [Yes] solidly into the ’80s."

Music video
The song's music video was shown frequently on MTV, introducing the revamped Yes lineup and sound to a new generation of fans largely unfamiliar with the band's earlier progressive rock style. The music video was directed by graphic designer Storm Thorgerson who, as part of Hipgnosis, had previously designed the covers for the band's albums Going for the One and Tormato.  The video starred actor Danny Webb.

Keyboardist Tony Kaye does not appear in the video as at the time of the video shoot, Eddie Jobson was standing in as the band's keyboardist. Jobson can be seen briefly in a few quick shots in the beginning band scene and from behind during the rooftop scene, but he was not part of the video's "animal transformation" scene in which the other four band members take part; the video was edited to remove as much of his appearance as possible. Ultimately, Kaye returned to the lineup and Jobson never recorded any material with the band.

The video was filmed in London, with some scenes filmed on top of various buildings. Scenes of the band playing are also present.

Legacy
The song has been covered by various artists, especially Max Graham whose 2005 single reached No. 9 in the UK. Frank Zappa adapted the primary riff of the song into a soloing vamp in live versions of his song "Bamboozled by Love" during his 1984 and 1988 tours, which can be heard on You Can't Do That on Stage Anymore, Vol. 3  and The Frank Zappa AAAFNRAA Birthday Bundle.

Personnel 
Yes

 Jon Anderson – lead and backing vocals 
 Trevor Rabin – lead guitar, synthesizers, lead and backing vocals
 Chris Squire – bass guitar, backing vocals
 Alan White – drums, Fairlight CMI
 Tony Kaye – keyboards

Production

 Trevor Horn – production

Charts

Original version

Weekly charts

Year-end charts

Max Graham vs. Yes version

Weekly charts

Year-end charts

Certifications

See also
 List of number-one mainstream rock hits (United States)
 List of Hot 100 number-one singles of 1984 (U.S.)
 List of Cash Box Top 100 number-one singles of 1984

References

Sources
}

External links

"Owner of a Lonely Heart" at Discogs (all releases)

1983 singles
1984 singles
2004 singles
2005 singles
Billboard Hot 100 number-one singles
Cashbox number-one singles
Yes (band) songs
Song recordings produced by Trevor Horn
Songs written by Trevor Horn
Songs written by Chris Squire
Songs written by Trevor Rabin
Songs written by Jon Anderson
Songs about loneliness
Dance-rock songs
1983 songs
Atco Records singles
1979 songs